High School Musical: O Desafio is a spin-off film, to the High School Musical franchise. It is one of three feature film adaptations of a script written by Pablo Lago and Susana Cardozo and based on the book Battle of the Bands; this release for the Brazil market. The film stars the finalists of the Brazilian reality television High School Musical: A Seleção competition series, including: Olavo, Renata, Fellipe, Paula, Moroni, Beatriz, Samuel and Karol. Additionally, Wanessa Camargo features in a supporting role. Principal photography took place in April 2009, in Rio de Janeiro and Olodum; and is notable for being the third Disney-branded feature film made in Latin America. To coincide with the Argentine culture, Bahia collaborated on developing a unique rhythm to the movie's choreography.

High School Musical: O Desafio was released on August 24, 2008 in Auditorio Nacional of Mexico City.

Plot

1ª part 
A new school year begins at the High School Brasil (HSB), and the students return from the summer vacations. Olavo, the captain of the school futsal team, the Lobos-Guará, discovers that Renata, his neighbor and classmate, has changed a lot over the summer. Paula, however, continues being vain and wastes her time dominating her poor brother, Fellipe, and her associates Alícia, Clara and Karol, or, as she prefers to call them, "The Invisibles".

2ª part 
The principal of the school and Ms. Márcia, the art teacher, invite the students to take part in the school's first battle of the bands, where the kids will have a chance to be showcased as true music stars. Wanessa, a former student and now a famous singer, comes to the school as adviser to the contest.

3ª part 
Working against the clock and with limited resources, the kids put all the forces for the big day. Olavo and Renata, together with their friends Moroni, Bia, Samuel, Fábio and Ed, as well as Fellipe, participate in the contest, forming a band named The Tribe. At the same time, Paula participates with her friends, and she tries the impossible task of separating Fellipe from his new friends. But only one band will be the winner, the one which can understand that teamwork, personal development, and study will make them better artists and also better people.

Cast
 Olavo (Olavo Cavalheiro) is the male protagonist of the movie. He is the most popular male student at High School Brazil, and the captain of the Futsal team, the Lobos-Guará. He faces a new challenge this year in the school: forming a band for the Battle of the Bands, where he will show, despite of the difficulties, his true leadership.
 Renata (Renata Ferreira) is the female protagonist of the movie. She is the shy and studious student who, under the astonished eyes of all her peers, suddenly becomes an attractive young girl with a talent for singing. When she feels insecure, Wanessa encourages her to be herself and exhibit her artistic talents without fears.
 Paula (Paula Barbosa) is the antagonist of the film. She is the typical "rich girl", vain, selfish, who does not spare a second for the others, even for her brother Fellipe, except to get what she wants: to be the absolute and undisputed star of the school. But at the end, she learns a valuable lesson and redeems herself.
 Felipe (Fellipe Guadanucci) is Paula's brother, who must use all his ingenuity to evade the surveillance of his sister to be the coach of Olavo's band. With Renata's help, and with his perseverance and recklessness, Fellipe manages to become independent and show his true artistic abilities.
 Moroni (Moroni Cruz) is Olavo's friend and he does his best to help the Lobos-Guará team to win the state competition.
 Samuel (Samuel Nascimento) is Olavo's other friend, who has a deep platonic love for Wanessa. When there is a funny comment or sudden laughter, that is Samuel, the guy who never loses his sense of humor.
 Bia (Beatriz Machado) is the talented composer of the band. She also demonstrates her positive attitude when time is their principal enemy.
 Karol (Karol Cândido) is a great singer, but because she joins Paula's musical group, she is always overshadowed by the "star".
 Wanessa (Wanessa Camargo) is the adviser of the contest, is a former HSB student and now a famous singer.
 Teacher Márcia (Débora Olivieri) is HSB's art teacher, who, together with the principal, convenes the Battle of the Bands.
 The High School Principal (Cláudio Torres Gonzaga)
 Renata's Mom (Tereza Seiblitz)
 Olavo's Dad (Tadeu Aguiar)
 Paula's and Felipe's father (Herbert Richers Jr)
 Paula's and Felipe's mother (Carolina Ilana Kaplan)
 Clara and Alícia (Gisele Batista and Michelle Batista) are Paula's unconditional allies and members of her band. The two girls are completely subordinated to the whims and arrogance of the "star".
Fábio (Fábio Enriquez) is a member of the Lobos-Guará team.
Ed (Eduardo Lamdim) is the goalkeeper of the Lobos-Guará team.
Douglas (Douglas Ferregui) Lobos-Guará team.

List of songs

There are songs in the film that weren't included in the official soundtrack above.

References

External links
 

2010 films
Brazilian musical films
2010s Portuguese-language films
Films shot in Rio de Janeiro (city)
High School Musical films
Walt Disney Pictures films
2010s American films